Morganville is an unincorporated community in Morgan County, in the U.S. state of Ohio.

History
Morganville was laid out in 1833. A post office called Morgansville was established in 1844, and remained in operation until 1908.

References

Unincorporated communities in Morgan County, Ohio
Unincorporated communities in Ohio
1833 establishments in Ohio